Sea Limited (Stylized as: sea) is a tech conglomerate headquartered in Singapore. Established in 2009 by Forrest Li, Sea was initially founded as Garena, a game development and publishing company known for its Free Fire title. The company rebranded itself under the present-day Sea brand in May 2017 after securing funding worth US$550 million, although the Garena brand was retained for its digital entertainment arm. Sea has over 67,000 employees, as of 2022.

Sea currently functions as a holding company for Garena, SeaMoney, and Shopee. Since 2020, Sea is also the owner of Singapore Premier League football club Lion City Sailors FC, after Forrest Li acquired, privatised and renamed Home United.

History 
On 9 September 2021, Sea was reportedly raising up to US$7.2 billion in an equity and convertible bond sale, which would make it Southeast Asia's largest fund raising. Sea said it planned to use the cash for strategic investments and potential acquisitions.

In January 2022, Chinese gaming giant Tencent offloaded its US$3 billion investment in Sea.

Products

Shopee 
Shopee is a technology company focused mainly on e-commerce. Shopee was first launched in Singapore in 2015, and has grown to become the largest e-commerce platform in Southeast Asia with 343 million monthly visitors. The company also serves consumers and sellers throughout in several countries across the Americas and Europe who wish to purchase and sell their goods online.

SeaMoney 
SeaMoney is an internet services company specialized in digital payments and financial services. Regarded as Sea's payments arm, its offerings include mobile wallet services, payment processing, credit offerings, and related digital financial products and services. These are available in seven markets across Southeast Asia and Taiwan under various brands, including ShopeePay, SPayLater, and other brands. SeaMoney served over 52 million users as of the second quarter of 2022.

Garena 
Garena is the digital entertainment arm of Sea and distributes game titles on Garena+, an online game and social platform run by the company since 2012 for people to discover, download and play online games. Garena distributes game titles through Garena+ in various countries across Southeast Asia and Taiwan, including MOBA games League of Legends and Heroes of Newerth, the online football (soccer) game FIFA Online 3, the first-person shooter game Point Blank, the mobile MOBA game Arena of Valor and the mobile racing game Speed Drifters.

In 2017, Garena developed Free Fire, an online action-adventure game that became the most downloaded game on the Google Play Store in 2019.

As of the second quarter of 2021, Garena recorded 725 million active users, 45% more than the year prior, while the number of paid users jumped 85% year-on-year, reaching 92 million. The outlook for Garena declined in 2022, after reports in March suggested that Garena will post US$2.9 to US$3.1 billion in bookings for the year, down from US$4.6 billion in 2021. The muted forecast would also be Garena's first decline in business ever. The ban imposed on its Free Fire title in India across both Google Play and Apple app stores has been cited as one of the contributory factors.

References

External links 
Official website
2009 establishments in Singapore
Companies established in 2009
Holding companies of Singapore
Companies listed on the New York Stock Exchange